The Golden Triangle of the Yvelines is an expression used to refer to the Yvelines area of France that includes suburban Chatou, Croissy-sur-Seine, and Le Vésinet, due to the number of wealthy residents, which include many state leaders, CEOs, and celebrities.

The expression Golden Triangle in a French context, initially referred to the area of Paris bounded by the Avenues des Champs-Élysées, George V, and Montaigne.

Culture of Paris